was a train station located on the Kurihara Den'en Railway Company Kurihara Den'en Railway Line in Kurihara, Miyagi Prefecture, Japan.

Line
Kurihara Den'en Railway Company, Kurihara Den'en Railway Line

Surrounding area
Miyagi Uguisuzawa Technical High School (renamed Iwagasaki Technical High School after merging with Iwagasaki High School in the nearby town of Kurikoma)[2].

History
1 April 1952: Station begins operation
1 April 2007: Station ends operation

Adjacent stations

Railway stations in Miyagi Prefecture
Kurihara Den'en Railway Line
Defunct railway stations in Japan
Railway stations in Japan opened in 1952
Railway stations closed in 2007